Chang Hyuk-jin (born 6 December 1989) is a South Korean professional footballer who plays as a midfielder for K League 1 club Suwon.

Club career
Chang joined Gangwon FC for the 2011 K League season, having previously turned out for National League side Gangneung City FC. His first match for Gangwon was the second group match of the 2011 K-League Cup against the Chunnam Dragons, in which he came on as a substitute midway through the second half. Chang's first match in the K-League itself was against Ulsan Hyundai FC, again as a substitute.

Ahead of the 2022 season, Chang joined Suwon after being part of a swap deal involving Jeong Chung-geun.

Club career statistics

References

External links

1989 births
Living people
Footballers from Seoul
South Korean footballers
Association football midfielders
Gangwon FC players
Gangneung City FC players
Gimcheon Sangmu FC players
Ansan Greeners FC players
Gyeongnam FC players
Suwon FC players
K League 1 players
K League 2 players
Korea National League players